Miranda House is a constituent college for women at the University of Delhi in India. Established in 1948, it is one of the top ranked colleges of the country and ranked as number 1 for consecutively six years (as of 2022).

History

Miranda House was founded in 1948 by the university vice-chancellor, Sir Maurice Gwyer.  In a magazine published by him in 1952, he wrote three reasons as to why the college was called Miranda. His favorite actress was Carmen Miranda, his daughter's name was Miranda, and a character named Miranda in William Shakespeare’s play The Tempest was, according to him, a perfect example of what a lady should be. Its foundation stone was laid by Lady Edwina Mountbatten on 7 March of the same year. Miranda House is built of red bricks on the university campus. Its original design was planned by the architect Walter Sykes George and is architecturally similar to other educational institutions in India founded in the colonial era. As the college grew, several buildings were added.

Alumni and students of this college are known as Mirandians.

Miranda House started with 33 students in July 1948, which rose to 105 by September the same year. It was 2,090 in 1997–98. The academic staff increased from six in 1948 to 120 (permanent) in 1997–98 and that of non-academic staff from 11 in 1948 (five in the hostel and six in the college) to 120 in 1997–98. The college accommodation (hostel) housed 43 students in 1948, of whom seven were enrolled at other colleges of the University of Delhi. There are now 250 students in the hostel.

Miranda House pioneered science education for women at the University of Delhi when it started its B.Sc. Honours (Botany) course in 1948. Science teaching was conducted in the university and in 1963–64, B.Sc. General and in 1971, B.Sc. Honours teaching work started in the college. Many new subjects have been introduced in the humanities and social sciences since then.

Miranda House provides liberal education in social sciences, humanities and the basic sciences. The college's infrastructure includes teaching laboratories and general facilities. , Miranda House has more than 4,000 students.

Academics
Miranda House offers a wide array of undergraduate and postgraduate courses. All undergraduate courses commencing from the academic year 2014-15 are according to the three-year undergraduate honours degree system.

Undergraduate courses
 B.A.Programme
B.A. Honours: Bengali, Economics, English, Geography, Hindi, History, Hindustani Music (Vocal/ Instrumental), Philosophy, Political Science, Sanskrit, Sociology
B.Sc. Honours: Botany, Chemistry, Mathematics, Physics, Zoology
B.Sc.: Life Sciences, Physical Science (Computer Science)
B.El.Ed: (four-year course)

Postgraduate courses
Students enroll for M.A. and M.Sc. programmes in the college; classes are held at the respective departments at the university.

 M.A. programme: The same subjects are offered as at the B.A. Honours level except for Political Science, Geography, and Sociology.
 M.Sc. programme: The same subjects are offered as at the B.Sc. Honours level. Additionally, the college offers M.Sc. in Anthropology.

Four-year undergraduate program
The University of Delhi introduced the four-year undergraduate program scheme in the academic year 2013-14. All undergraduate programs offered by the University of Delhi would thenceforth be for the duration of four years, with multiple exit options and the inclusion of research components. This reform was intended to provide greater flexibility and wider range of choices to the students.

In June 2014, after a lot of controversy, speculation and protests, the four-year undergraduate program was removed according to the directives of the University Grants Commission. All the constituent colleges of the University of Delhi were instructed to return to the previous three-year format for first degrees.

Now a Choice-Based Credit System (CBCS) is being followed in the University of Delhi.

Foreign Language Courses
The College offers One Year Certificate Courses in French, German, and Spanish in collaboration with the Department of Germanic and Romance Studies and Department of East Asian Studies, University of Delhi.

Short Duration Certificate Courses 
The College offers a 2 months certificate course in Computer Applications and a 16 weeks certificate course in Computer Applications for Visually Challenged Students. The college does not charge a fee for Computer Applications for Visually Challenged Students.

Library
The Miranda House Library acquired its first book on 22 July 1948. In the beginning it was confined to one room. The present building was constructed under the guidance of the founder librarian, P. Tandon. The foundation stone was laid by Prime Minister Indira Gandhi on 7 March 1973.

The new library block is a double-storeyed building consisting of deposit-counter, issue-of-books counter, stack hall, reserve section, reading hall, teachers' reading room, magazine section, and administrative section.

Amba Dalmia Resource Centre
Miranda House is the first college to establish a computer-based resource centre to aid its visually challenged students. Work on the resource centre was initiated in 2006, with an endowment from Ms Manju Kapur Dalmia, author and member of teaching faculty at Miranda House.

D S Kothari Centre

D S Kothari Centre for Research and Innovation in Science Education and Amstel Institute (University of Amsterdam, the Netherlands) have instituted this project in collaboration. The primary objective is to improve the quality of science education in schools by introducing Information and Communication Technologies (ICT) tools embedded in carefully designed learning environments.

The centre conducts baseline tests for undergraduate students and a prestigious 'Science Award' is given to a student from all the science departments and years on the basis of a test scores and a presentation on a contemporary and interdisciplinary topic.

Summer internships, lectures and camps have been successfully organized by the centre.

Placement cell
The placement cell of the college consists of faculty members and student volunteers. The Placement Cell coordinates the activities of career counseling and campus recruitment.

Rankings

Miranda House has ranked first among colleges in India by the National Institutional Ranking Framework (NIRF) in 2017, 2018, 2019, 2020 and 2021.

Campus

Architecture
Located in the University of Delhi's north campus enclave, Miranda House was designed by architect Walter Sykes George in a similar style to other colonial educational institutions of the country. The college hostel is among the oldest residential buildings in the university. The hostel section is laid out in a quadrangle, with gardens placed out by bottle palms. In the past six decades, as the college has grown, several other buildings have been added to its original design. The campus is now declared a heritage building.

Since the beginning, Miranda House has undergone numerous physical changes and has grown with additions to its original layout plan. The major features of its structure are the main college building, the library, and the hostel block. In the 1950s, the new building for lectures was constructed. The principal's office, college office, teachers' lounge, students' common room, and sheds for four college buses were built during this period. The college auditorium, equipped with microphones, and the cafeteria building came up during this time. New classrooms were added by partitioning the old library hall. The new administrative section was built in the centre of the teaching wing. Some classrooms on the ground floor were converted into the administrative block, which also houses the principal's new office.

In its Golden Jubilee Year, the college auditorium was renovated under the supervision of interior designer and old Mirandian Ketaki Sood. A rock garden was set up in the space behind the students' common room and in front of the cafeteria.

Miranda House hostel

Miranda House was a residence before it became a college. Miranda House hostel was founded in 1948 by the vice-chancellor, Sir Maurice Gwyer; its foundation stone was laid by Lady Edwina Mountbatten on 7 March the same year. The building was designed by architect Walter George.

The dining hall has a high arched ceiling, monastic tables and benches. There is a common room and an open coffee lounge attached to it. Declared a Heritage Building, extensive restoration and refurbishment work was undertaken in the hostel. It has 120 twin and seven four-person rooms. The day-to-day functioning is taken care of by a full-time resident warden and a housekeeper. The hostel administrative team includes the principal, the vice-principal, the bursar, teacher representatives on the hostel committee, and the hostel warden.

Student life

Women's Development Cell

The Women's Development Cell of Miranda House is an integral part of the college, constituting women working together for a gender equal world while categorically expanding their feminist politics. They are committed to creating dialogues about issues surrounding gender, race, sexuality, prejudice and facilitate formation of safe spaces within community. The goal is to facilitate feminist street activism and feminist digital activism.
With “Intersectionality” as their core value, they strive to empower Women to spark transformation in their own communities while at the same time expanding the category of “Woman”. 
Their motto “Together We Rise”, we aim to forge solidarity with different movements happening across the globe to anchor beyond the binaries.

Societies
Miranda House constitutes various cultural societies including Mridang (Indian Dance), Tanz (Western Dance), Anukriti (Hindi Dramatics), Ariels (English Dramatics), Geetanjali (Indian Music), Orpheus (Western Music), Celluloid (Film Club), Snapshots (Photography), BlueQuill (Creative Writing Club), Enactus (social entrepreneurship), Adwitiya (Fine Arts), Shabdita (Hindi literary society), Debating Society, Quiz Society, Gandhi Study Circle, TULA, MH Vatavaran, etc. The societies have members who enter through ECA trials and then, additional members are selected through various rounds of auditions.

National Cadet Corps (NCC)
Miranda House NCC Company has 160 cadets, of whom 80 are enrolled in the Army wing. As per change in the NCC policy making training for two years, many second-year students can join NCC.

National Service Scheme (NSS)
NSS has two core activities: teaching the children of the support staff and the underprivileged children in the neighboring areas; reading and recording for the visually challenged students of the college. Volunteers also participate in seminars, social campaigns and related competitions.

Sports and games

The department organizes fresher competitions in cross-country race, basketball and table tennis. Cross-country races are always for a social cause like Run for Peace, Run for Our Kargil Heroes, Plant More Trees, etc. The school provides special coaching for basketball, chess, cross-country race, softball, tennis, table tennis, track and field, volleyball and other games like cricket as per student demand. College teams participate in inter-college and open tournaments. Many students are selected to represent Delhi in the All India Inter University competitions and national-level competitions.

The college organizes an inter-college table tennis tournament for men and women. The other important date in the sports calendar is the college's Annual Sports Day.

International collaborations and exchange programmes
A team of 17 students and three faculty members from the Utrecht Business School, Hogeschool Utrecht University of Applied Sciences visited the University of Delhi for an inter-cultural contact program from 19 to 23 October 2009. Miranda House and Sri Ram College of Commerce hosted this team through a week-long course on management and culture. Sixteen students from Miranda House and fifteen from Sri Ram College of Commerce participated in the program. The program was the second of a series initiated in 2008 with support from K. Sreenivas, dean of international relations at University of Delhi. It was initiated by presentations by students from each country showcasing their business and cultural environments. Students then attended a series of workshops and lectures on aspects of inter-cultural business interactions and marketing. These sessions were conducted by faculty from the Utrecht Business School as well as Delhi University.

Students' Union
The Students' Union consists of the president, vice president, general secretary and two central councillors. These office bearers are elected by the students. The Students' Union organizes TEMPEST, the annual cultural festival of Miranda House, and addresses all student-related problems.

Activism
In 1970 the Miss Miranda beauty contest was abolished by an overwhelming majority of students despite strong opposition by the principal and faculty members. Led by the president of the Student Union, feminist activist Madhu Kishwar, the students protested against beauty being the criterion for the contest.

During the Sikh riots in Delhi in 1984, students of Miranda House organized relief camps for the victims. Film-maker Shonali Bose, who was a student at Miranda, made the Sikh riots the subject of her film Amu.

Students protested "unreasonable curfew times" for women in 2015, in a campaign called "Break the Cage."

Former principals

Veda Thakurdas (1948–1956), the founder principal of Miranda House, was the first woman to do an MA in Mathematics from Punjab University in 1930 and a Tripos from Cambridge. Retired: 1966-67. Died: 26 February 1984.
S. Krishnaswamy (1957–1964), the principal of Maharani College, Bangalore, before coming to Miranda House. She was instrumental in starting the teaching of science courses in the college; the plan for science teaching in Miranda House was mooted during her time. She left Miranda House to take up an assignment as an education advisor in Tanganyika. Died: August 1982.
M. Chandy (1964–1971) was teaching in the Department of Zoology, University of Delhi, before joining Miranda House as principal. During her principalship, the Indo-American Women College Exchange Programme was initiated. N.S.S. was introduced during her tenure. Died: May 1989.
A. C. Janaki amma (1971–1981) joined Miranda House as a lecturer in 1948. She obtained her doctorate from the London School of Economics. During her tenure as principal, the new library building was built. She was secretary of N.C.W.E.B., University of Delhi, between 1963 and 1969. Died: 20 October 1994.
T. S. Rukmani (1982–1993), a former student of Miranda House (1949–1954), she taught Sanskrit in I.P. College, University of Delhi, before assuming charge of Miranda House and was also the secretary of N.C.W.E.B., University of Delhi. She was awarded, D. Litt. by the University of Delhi. , she held the chair of Hindu Studies at Concordia University, Montreal.
Kiran Datar (1993 to 2000) is an old Mirandian. Before coming to Miranda House as principal, she was teaching at J.D.M., University of Delhi. She did M.A. in History from the University of Delhi and was a Fulbright Fellow of the University of Washington, U.S.A. She obtained her Ph.D. from Jawaharlal Nehru University, New Delhi. She has been a recipient of Dorothy Lee Grant and was awarded the Mahila Shiromani Award in 1994 for excellence in a chosen field of activity (Education).
Dr. Pratibha Jolly (2005-2019) was the Principal of Miranda House. She gained Ph.D. for theoretical work in Chemical Physics from the University of Delhi and taught in Miranda House for eight years before joining the Department of Physics at the University of Delhi as a Research Scientist where she began work in the area of Physics Education Research and Curriculum Development at the tertiary level. Her research interests include computational physics; electronic instrumentation; use of computer-based technologies in education; development of locally produced low-cost equipment; teacher training; cognitive aspects of students’ learning and diverse student populations. A major thrust has been to engage undergraduate students in the development of a package called Science Online consisting of an indigenous low-cost data-acquisition system and comprehensive set of sensor circuits for real-time measurements in multidisciplinary contexts.

Notable alumni

Notable alumni include:
 Aditi Phadnis, political journalist
 Anita Desai, author
 Arti Mehra, mayor of Delhi
 Anita Pratap, TV and print journalist
 Amita Dhanda, legal academic and disability activist
 Anjolie Ela Menon, artist
 Anuja Chauhan, author
 Brinda Karat, politician
 Gaiti Hasan, scientist
 Indrani Dasgupta, model
 Jasleen Dhamija, textile historian
 Jalabala Vaidya, stage actress
 Minissha Lamba, actress
Mouni Roy, Actress
 Madhu Kishwar, social activist
 Madhur Jaffrey, actress, author of cookbooks
 Mallika Sherawat, actress and model
 Meira Kumar, first female Speaker of Lok Sabha & Member of Parliament, India
 Mira Nair, filmmaker
 Nandita Das, filmmaker and actress
 Nalini Singh, journalist
 Neeti Mohan, singer
 Neha Sharma, [[IAS]]
 Nina Sibal, diplomat and writer 
 Ritu Menon, feminist and writer
 Romola Butalia, journalist, author
 Sheila Dikshit, politician, former Chief Minister of Delhi
 Shakti Mohan, performer
 Shonali Bose, filmmaker
 Shovana Narayan, Kathak dancer, Indian government officer, awarded Padma Shri
 Shyamala Pappu, lawyer
 Swara Bhaskar, actress
 Syeda Saiyidain Hameed, member of the Planning Commission, awarded Padma Shri
 Urvashi Butalia, feminist and historian

In popular culture
Filmmaker and Miranda House alumnae Mira Nair shot scenes of her movie The Reluctant Fundamentalist, starring Riz Ahmed and Kate Hudson, at Miranda House.

Miranda House also appears in Neeraj Pandey's Akshay Kumar starrer Special 26. Pandey needed to replicate CBI headquarters, for which the crew recommended the heritage hall at Miranda House. Scenes of Rakeysh Omprakash Mehra’s acclaimed movie Bhaag Milkha Bhaag with Farhan Akhtar in the lead were shot in the College. The introduction song "Fukrey" and most of the college sequences of the film were shot in Miranda House.

Kabir Singh starring Shahid Kapoor and Kiara Advani was also shot in the campus.

References

External links
 

Universities and colleges in Delhi
Educational institutions established in 1948
Delhi University
Women's universities and colleges in Delhi
1948 establishments in India